Attorney General Easton may refer to:

John Easton (1624–1705), Attorney General of Rhode Island
John J. Easton Jr. (born 1943), Attorney General of Vermont
Rufus Easton (1774–1834), Attorney General of Missouri